The  Military Ordinariate of Uganda  is a military ordinariate of the Roman Catholic Church. Immediately subject to the Holy See, it provides pastoral care to Roman Catholics serving in Uganda People's Defence Force and their families.

History
It was created as a military vicariate on 20 January 1964, and elevated to a military ordinariate on 21 July 1986.

Office holders

Military vicars
 Cipriano Biyehima Kihangire (appointed 20 January 1964 – resigned 5 January 1985)
 James Odongo (appointed 5 January 1985 – became Military Ordinary 21 July 1986 see below)

Military ordinaries
 James Odongo (see above current incumbent, appointed 21 July 1986)

References
 Military Ordinariate of Uganda (Catholic-Hierarchy)
 Military Ordinariate of Uganda (GCatholic.org)

Uganda
Uganda
1964 establishments in Uganda
Mbale